MasterChef India – Tamil (or simply MasterChef Tamil) is an Indian Tamil-language competitive cooking reality show based on MasterChef Australia and is part of MasterChef India. Produced by Innovative Film Academy and Endemol Shine India, it is broadcast on Sun TV. The show is hosted by Vijay Sethupathi. The show was originally supposed to be aired in May 2021; however, due to the COVID-19 pandemic in India, the show was pushed back to 7 August 2021. The debut season of the Tamil version of MasterChef made the MasterChef format surpass 500 seasons worldwide.

In November 2021, the series was renewed for Season 2, which is set to premiere sometime in 2023.

Format 
The show features 14 contestants (only commoner people), with three chefs as judges. It is broadcast weekly every Saturday and Sunday on Sun TV at 9:30pm (India Time). In Season 1, the top 24 competed until 14 were left, with the final 14 progressing to the main stage of the show. The winner competes for a prize that includes their own restaurant, the chance to have their own chef coat, and  25,00,000 in cash and the MasterChef trophy.

Episodes
MasterChef India - Tamil aired two nights a week on the weekends. Each night features a different episode format, however, some episodes modify the format slightly. The typical episode formats are as follows:

Saturdays usually feature a cooking challenge — each home cook participates in a Mystery Challenge, Pair Challenge, or a Team Challenge. They are asked to prepare a dish using a core ingredient(s) featured that day. Depending on their performance, the judges declare the ones with the top dishes safe from the Pressure Test, which takes place the following day; the participants performing poorly go on to compete in the Pressure Test.

Sundays typically feature a Pressure Test or some other form of Elimination Challenge. The bottom three contestants from the preceding night are given a recipe for a particular dish which they are to emulate in an allotted time. The judges then taste their outputs and depending on their level of performance, select one contestant — whose performance was the poorest — who is eliminated from the competition.

Series

Season 1

MasterChef India – Tamil 1 aired from 7 August 2021. Hosted by Vijay Sethupathi, while professional chefs such as  Harish Rao,  Aarthi Sampath and Koushik S are the judges for this season. The show telecasted on every Saturday and Sunday at  9:30 pm on Sun TV. It also streamed on Sun NXT platform. The season was won by Devaki Vijayaraman from Trichy, Tamil Nadu while Nithya Franklyn emerged as the runner up.

Production

Development 
In early 2021, Sun TV Network secured the production rights of MasterChef in Tamil.

Filiming 
Filming of the show began in late June 2021.

Other versions 
Regarding other Indian regional languages, MasterChef was initially adapted in Hindi under the name of MasterChef India. Later adapted to Telugu as MasterChef India – Telugu. In addition, Kannada and Malayalam adaptations were planned.

References

External links
 

Tamil-language game shows
2021 Tamil-language television series debuts
2020s Tamil-language television series
Tamil-language cooking television series
Tamil-language television shows
Tamil-language television series based on British television series
Tamil-language reality television series
MasterChef
MasterChef India
Sun TV original programming